is an anime television series produced by Tezuka Productions that first ran from October 12, 1989, to October 11, 1990, on TV Tokyo. It is a remake of Osamu Tezuka's 1960s anime series Kimba the White Lion.

Original Japanese cast
Megumi Hayashibara as Leo (young)
Sakiko Tamagawa as Liya
Shinnosuke Furumoto as Leo (cub)
Hiroshi Masuoka as Kutta
Isao Sasaki as Panja
Kappei Yamaguchi as Kenichi
Kei Tomiyama as Ham Egg
Mahito Tsujimura as Ban Shunsaku
Masako Nozawa as Gibo
Rokuro Naya as Lamp
Ryusei Nakao as Totto
Shigeru Chiba as Coco
Sukekiyo Kameyama as Tony

English dub cast
In 1998 which was nearly a decade after the original Japanese release, Pioneer Family Entertainment (which then became Geneon Universal which is now known as NBCUniversal Entertainment Japan as of today) has gotten the rights to pick up the series and for distribution in North America under license from Nippon Herald Films. They along with Ocean Studios in Vancouver, Canada, worked together to produce an English dub of the series with an all-star Canadian voice cast, using the Wordfit System and with Karl Williams serving as the director.

Unfortunately, only 13 out of 52 episodes were dubbed in English and the series was left on a cliffhanger, due to the poor quality of the dubbing. From October 13, 1998 to July 27, 1999, six VHS volumes were released across North America with the first tape having three episodes and the rest having two. Episodes 2 and 3 were not dubbed for the English-speaking market mostly due to the  content, despite having its importance in the series' through that particular arc. So Pioneer decided to have that arc skipped, thus having Episodes 1, followed by 4 up to 15 dubbed. On top of that, the episodes were edited heavily during production of the English adaptation dub, involving scenes cut and changed, as well as having the score entirely redone digitally, that was sampled with E-mu Proteus 2 Orchestra, being one of the synthesizers used. The music was composed by Tom Keenlyside and John Mitchell and with the editing being handled by Gina Mueller and Eric LeBlanc.

Kathleen Barr
Ben Baxter
Lisa Ann Beley as Raiya
Don Brown as Caesar/Panja and Coco
Michael Dobson
Paul Dobson as Jamar
Marcy Goldberg
Christopher Gray
Saffron Henderson
Janyse Jaud
David Kaye as Icara
Campbell Lane
Andrea Libman
Lalainia Lindbjerg
Scott McNeil
Richard Newman as Old Dice
Ward Perry
Gerard Plunkett
Alvin Sanders
Kelly Sheridan as Riona
Matt Smith
Robert O. Smith as Tony
Chantal Strand
Brad Swaile as Kimba/Leo (cub)
Venus Terzo
French Tickner as Kutter
Cathy Weseluck

Dubbed episodes

1. Birth ("The Successor" in the Dub)

2. Promise

3. Departure

4. Friends (#2 in the Dub)

5. Homeland (#3 in the Dub)

6. Intruder (#4 - "The Invaders" in the Dub)

7. Courage (#5 in the Dub)

8. Warning (#6 in the Dub)

9. Companions (#7 - "Flash Flood" in the Dub)

10. Freedom (#8 in the Dub)

11. The Law of the Jungle (#9 in the Dub)

12. Red Wings (#10 in the Dub)

13. Prophecy (#11 in the Dub)

14. Wild (#12 in the Dub)

15. Failure (#13 in the Dub)

16. White Beast

17. Pride

18. Fighting Spirit

19. Life

20. Leader

21. Homecoming

22. Reunion

23. Migration

24. Friendship

25. Sacrifice Part 1

26. Sacrifice Part 2

27. Mourning

28. Image

29. Protection

30. Adventure

31. Trust

32. Nature

33. Paradise

34. Time Illusion

35. Threat

36. Reconciliation

37. Father

38. Best Friend

39. Nightmare

40. Escape

41. Premonition

42. Coexistence

43. Decision

44. Infiltration

45. Rebirth

46. Longing

47. Crown

48. Challenge

49. Concentration

50. Victory

51. Harmony Part 1

52. Harmony Part 2

References

External links
 
 
 The New Adventures of Kimba The White Lion at Tezuka Osamu @ World (archived)

1989 anime television series debuts
1990 Japanese television series endings
Japanese children's animated action television series
Japanese children's animated adventure television series
Anime series based on manga
Jungle Emperor Leo
Osamu Tezuka anime
TV Tokyo original programming
Tezuka Productions
Television shows set in Africa